Wilhelm Sulpiz Kurz (5 May 1834 – 15 January 1878) was a German botanist and garden director in Bogor, West Java and Kolkata. He worked in India, Indonesia, Burma, Malaysia and Singapore. This botanist is denoted by the author abbreviation Kurz when citing a botanical name.

Life
He was born in Augsburg near Munich, and was a pupil of Carl Friedrich Philipp von Martius. He studied botany, mineralogy and chemistry at the University of Munich. Family misfortunes in 1854 led him to abandon studies and move to Holland where he worked as an apothecary. He then joined the Dutch Colonial Army medical service and sailed to Java in September 1856.  He moved to Banka in March 1857 and in 1859 he joined an expedition to Bori, Sulawesi (Celebes). In September of the same year, he joined the Botanic Garden at Buitenzoorg where he had access to a large library and worked with botanists. In 1864 he was induced by Thomas Anderson, who was visiting the Dutch colonies to examine cinchona cultivation, to return with him to Calcutta as curator of the herbarium, a post he held till his death, to the great advantage of Indian botany.

In 1866 Kurz was sent to study the flora of the Andaman Islands. While in the South Andamans, he was attacked and tied up in the forest by convicts, leading to the abandonment of the project and his return to Calcutta. In 1867 he was asked to write botany texts for forest officers in British Burma which led him to travel and collect in the region. In November 1877 he left Calcutta for Penang but fell ill on reaching in December and died on 15 January 1878.

Works
Kurz's major work is his Forest Flora of British Burma, Calcutta, 1877, 2 vols. He also wrote articles in the Journal of the Asiatic Society of Bengal and the Journal of Botany.

References

Attribution

Botanists with author abbreviations
19th-century German botanists
1834 births
1878 deaths
Botanists active in India
German expatriates in India